Merlin Carl Wittrock (January 3, 1931 – November 28, 2007) was an American educational psychologist. He received the E. L. Thorndike Award in 1987.

Early life 
He was born in Twin Falls, Idaho in 1931. He received a bachelor's and master's degrees from the University of Missouri and his PhD from the University of Illinois.

Work

Generative theory of learning 
Wittrock is best known for his generative theory of learning. He first published this theory in 1974. It is the parent of many current theories of academic motivation.

Personal life 
Wittrock had three children with his wife, Nancy. He died of heart failure in November 2007 at the age of 76.

References 

1931 births
2007 deaths
20th-century American psychologists